HNoMS Storm was a 1.-class torpedo boat constructed in 1898. Storm served the Royal Norwegian Navy for almost 42 years, including neutrality protection duties during the First World War. She was lost in the 1940 Norwegian campaign of the Second World War. During the Norwegian Campaign, she was the only Norwegian warship that launched a torpedo against the invading Germans.

Design and construction
Following the successful introduction of the small coastal 2. class torpedo boats in the 1880s, the Royal Norwegian Navy decided to acquire a new class of larger torpedo boats, to carry out offensive operations at sea. The new warships, designated as 1. class torpedo boats, were introduced in 1896 with the purchase of three boats from the Schichau-Werke in Germany. A further seven boats of the class were built in Norway in 1898–1901, at the Royal Norwegian Navy Shipyard at Karljohansvern in Horten.

The class was considered reasonably seaworthy, although it was also found to be difficult to accurately fire torpedoes from the 1. class vessels in anything but calm seas. The German-built vessels, as well as the first three Norwegian-built ships, were criticized for having insufficient manoeuvrability, a design issue that was addressed in the final four vessels built. The class was also considered to have very poor ventilation, especially in the engine compartment.

The bridge of the 1. class torpedo boats was located in a turret near the bow. Visibility from the turret was poor and the commander would often remain outside, relying on another crew member to stand at the wheel and follow his directions.

Storm was the first of the 1. class torpedo boats to be built in Norway, as the first ship of a series of three constructed in 1898. She had yard number 79 at Karljohansvern, and was launched on 1 June 1898.

Storm was armed with two quick-firing 37 mm guns and two 45 cm torpedo tubes, and was manned by a crew of 19 officers and men.

Early service
The exercises in 1900 focused on developing the coordination between the coastal defence ships and the torpedo boats, as the two main weapon systems of the Royal Norwegian Navy. During the cruise Storm was under the command of Captain Oppegaard. Around 10 torpedo boats were equipped annually for unit exercises in the years up until the outbreak of the First World War.

First World War
In the lead-up to the First World War, the Royal Norwegian Navy mobilized. The mobilization was initiated on 2 August 1914 and initially completed on 5 August 1914. The Norwegian torpedo boats were scattered along the coast from the Oslofjord to Trøndelag, and took the brunt of the neutrality protection duties. The main task of the Royal Norwegian Navy's ships during the war was to confront foreign warships that approached Norwegian territorial waters, and by their presence to try to discourage neutrality violations.

Storm was based in Naare in Western Norway during the war, and in May 1915 carried out torpedo firing exercises together with other torpedo boats. From 1917 to 1919, Storm was under the command of South Pole explorer First Lieutenant Hjalmar Fredrik Gjertsen.

Inter-war years 
The Royal Norwegian Navy's ships suffered much wear and tear during the First World War and many were decommissioned in 1920, including 14 torpedo boats. Most of the remaining vessels were mothballed. With the introduction of the larger and more modern three-ship Trygg class in 1919–1921, most of the old torpedo boats remained inactive, and nine of them were rebuilt as patrol boats. Storm was one of only 14 pre-First World War torpedo boats to remain with the Royal Norwegian Navy until 1939.

Second World War

Neutrality protection
At the outbreak of the Second World War in September 1939, the Royal Norwegian Navy again mobilized. The torpedo boats were organized into five divisions and again spread along the coastline from the Oslofjord to Trøndelag.

Storm formed part of the 4th Torpedo Boat Division of the 2nd Naval District, along with her fellow 1. class torpedo boats  and Brand. As was the case with the other Norwegian torpedo boat units, the vessels of the 4th Torpedo Boat Division operated individually along the coast, protecting Norwegian shipping and guarding against neutrality violations. During the first months of the war Norwegian neutrality was repeatedly breached by both warring sides, most dramatically by the Royal Navy in the February 1940 Altmark Incident.

On 29 September 1939, the Norwegian merchant navy suffered its first loss to a U-boat, when the England-bound  was stopped by the German U-boat  and torpedoed and shelled after the crew abandoned ship. The lumber-carrying cargo ship broke in two, the bow section sinking and the stern section remaining afloat to be salvaged later. Following the attack, the crew sailed towards the Norwegian coast in two lifeboats. Shortly after the incident, the lifeboats were spotted by a seaplane of the Royal Norwegian Navy Air Service. Storm was directed to the scene, and took the lifeboats under tow to Sund near Bergen.

German invasion
When the Germans invaded Norway on 9 April 1940, Storm was patrolling near Buarøy off Bergen under the command of Lieutenant Thorleif Pettersen. This made Storm the only Norwegian torpedo boat to be ready for action at the time of the German attack; all the 16 other torpedo boats were either in port, in transit or undergoing repairs.

On 9 April 1940, Storm was guarding the approaches to Bergen, a restricted naval port, and was under orders to fire at any intruder. Reports of foreign warships moving against Norway had motivated the naval commander in Bergen, Rear-Admiral Carsten Tank-Nielsen to put his forces on a war footing. Lieutenant Pettersen had suggested to Admiral Tank-Nielsen placing his vessel at the outer line of the restricted area, with further forces closer to Bergen. Before reaching the area covered by Storm, any intruders would have to pass a line of small patrol boats with the task of identifying incoming ships and reporting back to Tank-Nielsen. By 22:00 on 8 April, Storm was in position to defend the Bergen approaches.

When the German task force detailed to capture Bergen arrived at the Lerøyosen approaches around 02:00, the advancing warships were illuminated by searchlights at the outlying Lerøy Fort. The torpedo fired by Storm missed and failed to detonate. Lieutenant Pettersen overestimated the speed of the incoming German ships, and the torpedo passed in front of the target. The torpedo was found by Storm later in the day and destroyed. The German task force pushed on towards Bergen, seizing the city after a battle with the coastal artillery batteries there. Following the attack, the German E-boats S-21 and S-24 attempted to intercept Storm, but the Norwegian torpedo boat managed to evade them. In the opinion of Lieutenant Pettersen, expressed in a post-war report, the torpedo had hit its target, but failed to explode.

The unsuccessful attack on the German task force made Storm the only Norwegian warship to launch a torpedo in anger during the Norwegian Campaign.

Storm next attempted to set up another attack farther north, but the German task force advanced through the area before the torpedo boat could get into position. Following the unsuccessful defence of the Bergen approaches, and a further unsuccessful search for incoming German troop ships, Storm left the area later in the day and steamed south to Bømlo. She remained hidden at Bømlo for the next three days.

Loss
Following the German capture of Bergen on 9 April 1940, the Royal Norwegian Navy in Western Norway reorganized to defend the surrounding fjords from further German advances. On 12 April, Storm was ordered to redeploy to Uskedal in the Hardangerfjord, and join other Norwegian warships in the defence of that area. On her way to Uskedal in the evening of 12 April, Storm struck a skerry at Stangholmene at 20:55 and sprang a leak. She turned around, and was beached stern first at Godøy. At 22:30 on 13 April, Storm capsized and sank at great depth.

Before Storm went down, her crew managed to remove much of the arms and ammunition on board. The crew members later joined the forces gathered in Uskedal.

References
Notes

Citations

Bibliography

Maritime incidents in April 1940
Torpedo boats of the Royal Norwegian Navy
World War II torpedo boats of Norway
World War II shipwrecks in the North Sea
Ships built in Horten
1898 ships
Ships sunk with no fatalities